Daniel Louis Broadbent (born 22 January 1985) is an English cricketer.  Broadbent is a left-handed batsman who bowls right-arm off break.  He was born in Leeds, Yorkshire.

Broadbent represented the Yorkshire Cricket Board in a single List A match against the Northamptonshire Cricket Board in the 1st round of the 2003 Cheltenham & Gloucester Trophy which was held in 2002.  In his only List A match, he scored an unbeaten 17 runs.

References

External links
Dan Broadbent at Cricinfo
Dan Broadbent at CricketArchive

1985 births
Living people
English cricketers
Yorkshire Cricket Board cricketers
Cricketers from Leeds